Estrela Negra de Bissau, usually known simply as Estrela Negra, is a traditional football (soccer) club based in Bissau, Guinea-Bissau.

Stadium
The club plays their home matches at Estádio Lino Correia, which has a maximum capacity of 10,000 people.

Bissau
Sport in Bissau